The 2005 Rally of Turkey was the seventh round of the 2005 World Rally Championship. It took place between June 2 and 5 of 2005, and was won by Sébastien Loeb.

Results

References

Turkey
Rally of Turkey
Rally
June 2005 sports events in Turkey